Hillside Golf Club is a golf club located in Southport, England. The club was founded in 1911. Classed as a "links" course, because of the type of vegetation and geography, it runs over 18 holes and about 7,000 yards, all the holes being between and on mainly large dunes and local indigenous pinewoods, typical of the immediate coastal area. The second group of nine holes, the "back nine" is often thought by professional golfers to be quite challenging. The club has hosted, in its history, a number of UK championships, and also including qualifying rounds for the Open.

It is physically close to both the Royal Birkdale Golf Club, near its south-western boundaries, and to the Southport and Ainsdale Golf Club, somewhat to the south of it.

The clubhouse was originally built in the style of an Edwardian private residence, and has been extended somewhat.

External links
Hillside Golf Club's Official Website

Golf clubs and courses in Merseyside
Sport in Southport